Fluke, or, I Know Why the Winged Whale Sings is a novel by American writer Christopher Moore. Published in 2003, it combines elements of absurdist and fantasy fiction, as well as the author's own brand of social commentary and humor.  A serious theme in the novel involves environmentalism, particularly that associated with whales; and the author's personal research-experience with marine biologists helped to inform much of the story.

An unabridged commercial audio cassette recording of Fluke has been issued with narration by Bill Irwin and whale songs.

On July 29, 2004, NBC's Today Show author Nicholas Sparks chose Fluke as the next title to be read by the Today Book Club.

Plot introduction
The plot of Fluke is set on and off the Hawaiian island of Maui as well as deep underneath the Pacific Ocean off the shore of Chile.

Nathan Quinn, a marine biologist, goes out on a routine day-trip expedition to survey whales in the area. When he photographs one of the whale's flukes, he notices that the words "BITE ME" are spelled out in huge letters on the mammal's tail-fin. His curiosity and investigations uncover one mystery after another as he seeks the answers concerning the source of this peculiarity.

See also

Bloop

References

External links
 Author's own site for the novel
 New York Times Review
 San Francisco Chronicle Review

Absurdist fiction
Novels by Christopher Moore
2003 fantasy novels
Cultural depictions of Amelia Earhart
Fiction about whales
Environmental fiction books